Haley Webb  is an American actress and filmmaker. She acts primarily in film and television and is the founder of the production company Legion of Horribles. Webb's most recent work includes independent films Netflix “Killer Cove”, Sugar Mountain (2016) opposite Cary Elwes and Jason Momoa, Rushlights (2013) opposite Aidan Quinn and Beau Bridges, On the Inside (2012) as Nick Stahl's girlfriend, The Final Destination (2009) as Janet Cunningham, and the MTV series Teen Wolf as Jennifer Blake.

Life and career
Webb grew up in Woodbridge, Virginia where she was captain of her school's dance team, and also earned her 1st Degree black belt in Tae Kwon Do. In 2001, she moved to San Diego, California and was active in her high school's theater department where she won various awards for her performances in productions of Rumors and Beauty and the Beast. In 2003, she competed in the Talent America Competition, winning the Western Region of the United States in dance and acting, and was discovered by longtime casting director/manager Gary Shaffer. Later that year she moved to Los Angeles, and began studying with acting instructor Howard Fine and at Joanne Baron / D.W. Brown Acting Studio.

Webb made her directorial debut with the 2012 short film Patti, about the life and work of musician Patti Smith, in which she played the eponymous role. She also served as producer, film editor, set decorator, sound editor, and costumer.

Personal life
Webb is openly bisexual, and is married to documentary filmmaker and photographer Alexander Drecun. In early 2021, Webb gave birth to her and Drecun's first child.

Filmography

Film

Television

Other

References

External links

HaleyWebb.com
Bad Cake Productions

Living people
21st-century American actresses
Actresses from Los Angeles
Actresses from San Diego
Actresses from Virginia
American female dancers
Dancers from Virginia
American feminists
American film actresses
American film editors
American film producers
American set decorators
American sopranos
American television actresses
American women film directors
Businesspeople from Los Angeles
Businesspeople from Virginia
Feminist musicians
Bisexual actresses
Bisexual musicians
Film directors from Virginia
Film producers from California
Musicians from San Diego
Singers from Virginia
Actors from Fairfax, Virginia
People from Woodbridge, Virginia
Singers from Los Angeles
American sound editors
American women company founders
Film directors from Los Angeles
American women film producers
21st-century American women singers
21st-century American women pianists
21st-century American pianists
American women film editors
21st-century American singers
American LGBT musicians
American bisexual actors
1985 births